HD 170469 is a probable binary star system in the equatorial constellation of Ophiuchus. It is too faint to be viewed with the naked eye, having an apparent visual magnitude of 8.21. The system is located at a distance of 197 light years away from the Sun based on parallax. It is drifting closer with a radial velocity of −59 km/s, and is expected to come to within  in about 959,000 years.

The primary, component A, is a G-type main-sequence star with a stellar classification of G5V, indicating it is generating energy through core hydrogen fusion. Estimates of the star's age range from five to almost nine billion years. It has 1.10 times the mass of the Sun and 1.24 times the Sun's radius. The star has a higher than solar metallicity. It is radiating 1.64 times the Sun's luminosity from its photosphere at an effective temperature of 5,786 K.

Initially it was thought to be a red dwarf of spectral class M1, but was later determined to be a K-type main-sequence star with a class of K5V.

Planetary system
In 2007, a planet was discovered by the N2K Consortium, led by principal investigators Debra Fischer and Gregory P. Laughlin. It was spotted using the radial velocity method, and was independently confirmed in 2014.

See also
 HD 125612
 HD 231701
 HD 17156
 HD 11506
 List of extrasolar planets

References

G-type main-sequence stars
K-type main-sequence stars
Binary stars
Planetary systems with one confirmed planet

Ophiuchus (constellation)
Durchmusterung objects
170469
090593
J18291097+1141437